American hip hop musician, songwriter and record producer Kanye West has released four video albums and been featured in various music videos. He has also made cameo appearances in films and appeared in several television programs.

Music videos

As lead artist

As featured artist

Cameo appearances

Video albums

Filmography

Television

Commercials

References

External links
Kanye West's official Vevo channel on YouTube
Videography of Kanye West at MTV
[ Discography and videography of Kanye West] at AllMusic

Videography
Videographies of American artists